The Joint Surveillance System (JSS) is a joint United States Air Force and Federal Aviation Administration system for the atmospheric air defense of North America.  It replaced the Semi Automatic Ground Environment (SAGE) system in 1983.

Overview

The JSS consists  of long range surveillance radars, primarily operated and maintained by the Federal Aviation Administration (FAA), but providing communication and radar data to both FAA and United States Air Force control centers.

Air Route Surveillance Radar
FAA equipment is primarily a mixture of Long Range Air Route Surveillance Radars (ARSR) of various types, although some use legacy AN/FPS radars.  They are co-located with UHF ground-air-ground (G/A/G) transmitter/receiver (GATR) facilities at many locations. Fourteen sites have VHF radios as well. The GATR facility provides radio access to fighters and Airborne early warning and control (AEW&C) aircraft from the Sector Operations Control Centers.  The JSS has been enhanced under the FAA/Air Force Radar Replacement Program with 44 ARSR-4/FPS-130 radars to replace some of the many previous long-range radars. This provides common, high-performance, unattended radars. The ARSR-4/FPS-130 is a 3-D long range radar with an effective detection range of some 250 miles and has been fully integrated with JSS at all joint use sites.

These radars are generally unattended except for periodic FAA maintenance crews which visit the sites as necessary. Hence, the 117 was also known as "minimally attended radar" (MAR).

Sector Operations Control Centers 
The USAF Air Combat Command portion of the JSS is composed of three Continental United States (CONUS) Sector Operations Control Centers (SOCC) equipped with Battle Control System-Fixed (BCS-F) displays.  Three of the SOCCs are located in the Continental United States (CONUS) at the following locations:
 Rome, New York   (Eastern Air Defense Sector)
 Tyndall AFB, Florida  (Air Operations Center for AFNORTH)
 McChord Field, Washington   (Western Air Defense Sector)

A SOCC is located in Alaska at Elmendorf AFB, in Hawaii at Wheeler Field and two in Canada at CFB North Bay, Ontario.  The mission of the SOCC network is peacetime air sovereignty and surveillance.  Wartime functions are available if necessary.  The SOCCs  accept data from multiple sensors, automatically process this data and display data for detection, tracking and identification of air targets, and the assignment and direction of interceptor aircraft to ensure peacetime air sovereignty.

Each SOCC functions as the primary command and control center in each NORAD region during crisis or attack as long as they are capable.

CONUS SOCCs receive data from 46 JSS radar sites.  Radar sites of the Alaska Radar System feeds data to Elmendorf AFB, Alaska and two radar sites supply data for the SOCC at Hickam Field, Hawaii.  Radars from the North Warning System network in Canada feed data to two Canadian SOCCs located at CFB North Bay, Ontario.

Command and control can be transitioned to the E-3A Airborne early warning and control (AEW&C) for survivability as the tactical situation warrants. In peacetime, six of these aircraft are assigned to co-operate with the JSS. ROCC information is also passed to the North American Air Defense Command (NORAD) Combat Operations Center (COC) in Colorado Springs, Colorado.

Radar stations
 see also: Alaska Radar System and Hawaii Region Air Operations Center

See also
 North Warning System

References

Ground radars
Military radars of the United States
Military electronics of the United States
Equipment of the United States Air Force
Federal Aviation Administration
Air traffic control in North America
Radar networks